†Orthonychiidae is an extinct taxonomic family of fossil sea snails, marine, gastropod mollusks in the clade Cyrtoneritimorpha.

There is an unusually great degree of variability within the shells of species in the genus Orthonychia, but an analysis of this variability has not been done yet (2008).

Genera
Genus Orthonychia Hall, 1843
Orthonychia acuta Roemer, 1856
Orthonychia baldwini Rohr et al., 1981
Orthonychia belli Clarke, 1908
Orthonychia bowsheri Yochelson, 1956
Orthonychia chesterense Meek & Worthen, 1866
Orthonychia concavum Hall, 1860
Orthonychia conicum Hall, 1860
Orthonychia conoidea  (Goldfuss, 1844)
Orthonychia cornuforme  (Winchell, 1863)
Orthonychia costata  (Barrois, 1889)
Orthonychia daschi  (Rohr & Smith, 1978)
Orthonychia dentalium Hall, 1862
Orthonychia enorme (Lindström, 1884) 
Orthonychia infabricatus Hyde, 1953
Orthonychia marblecreekensis Talent & Philip, 1956
Orthonychia obliquesulata Spitz, 1907
Orthonychia pajerensis Chronic, 1949
Orthonychia parva (Shumard & Swallow, 1858)
Orthonychia parvulum Whiteaves, 1892
Orthonychia pentalvea Talent & Philip, 1956
Orthonychia perplexum (Hall, 1879)
Orthonychia prosseri Clarke & Swartz, 1913
Orthonychia protei (Oehlert, 1883)
Orthonychia puellaris  (Whidborne, 1891)
Orthonychia quadrangularis (Whidborne, 1891)
Orthonychia rostratus (Trenkner, 1867)
Orthonychia sciotoensis Hyde, 1953
Orthonychia sileni (Oehlert, 1883)
Orthonychia subrectum Hall, 1860 - type species
Orthonychia steinbergensis Kegel, 1926
Orthonychia talon Tolmachoff, 1930
Orthonychia tortuosa (Hall, 1860)
Orthonychia trirotundolobatum (Talent & Philip, 1956)
Orthonychia unguiculata Clarke & Swartz, 1913
Orthonychia variablis Tyler, 1965
Orthonychia vishtytica Saladzius, 1966
Orthonychia vomerium (Winchell, 1863)
Orthonychia waverlyensis Hyde, 1953
 Orthonychia compressa / Platyceras (Orthonychia) compressum Girty 1910
 Orthonychia ungula / Platyceras (Orthonychia) ungula  (Weller, 1906)

References